Going-to-the-Sun Road is a scenic mountain road in the Rocky Mountains of the western United States, in Glacier National Park in Montana. The Sun Road, as it is sometimes abbreviated in National Park Service documents, is the only road that traverses the park, crossing the Continental Divide through Logan Pass at an elevation of 6,646 feet (2,026 m), which is the highest point on the road. Construction began in 1921 and was completed in 1932 with formal dedication in the following summer on July 15, 1933. Prior to the construction of the road, visitors would need to spend several days traveling through the central part of the park, an area which can now be traversed within a few hours, excluding any stops for sightseeing or construction.

The road is the first to have been registered in all of the following categories: National Historic Place, National Historic Landmark and Historic Civil Engineering Landmark. The road is approximately 50 miles (80 km) long and spans the width of the park between the east and west entrance stations. The National Historic Landmark Nomination records a slightly shorter distance of 48.7 miles which is measured from the first main intersection just outside the park's west entrance to Divide Creek in St. Mary, Montana on the east side of the park.

Name
The road is named after Going-to-the-Sun Mountain which dominates the eastbound view beyond Logan Pass. One Native American legend concerns the deity Sour Spirit who came down from the sun to teach the Blackfeet the basics of hunting. While returning to the sun, an image of Sour Spirit was placed on the mountain as an inspiration for the Blackfeet. Another story has suggested that a late-19th-century Euro-American explorer provided the mountain's name and the legend.

Design

Going-to-the-Sun Road, also known as Glacier Route 1 Road, is notable as one of the first National Park Service projects specifically intended to accommodate the automobile-borne tourist.  The road was first conceived by superintendent George Goodwin in 1917, who became the chief engineer of the Park Service the following year.  As chief engineer, the new road became Goodwin's primary project, and construction began in 1921.

As the project proceeded, Goodwin lost influence with National Park Service director Stephen Mather, who favored landscape architect Thomas Chalmers Vint's alternative routing of the upper portion of the road along the Garden Wall escarpment.  Vint's alignment reduced both switchbacks and the road's visual impact, at increased cost.  With Goodwin's resignation, Vint's proposal became the preferred alignment.  The entire project was finally opened from end to end in 1933, at a cost of $2.5 million.

The western terminus of the road is at U.S. Route 2 in West Glacier, Montana. The eastern terminus is at U.S. Route 89 in St. Mary.

The two-lane Going-to-the-Sun Road is quite narrow and winding, with hairpin turns, especially west of Logan Pass.

Repairs
The road is one of the most difficult roads in North America to snowplow in the spring. The road takes about ten weeks to plow, even with equipment that can move 4,000 tons of snow in an hour. On the east side of the Continental Divide, there are few guardrails due to heavy snows and the resultant late-winter avalanches that have destroyed protective barriers. The road is generally open from early June to mid October, with its latest opening on July 15, 2022, marking the record for the latest opening since the inaugural date of July 15, 1933.

A restoration project by the National Park Service and the Federal Highway Administration has been repairing road damage from many avalanches and rock slides over the years. The repairs, which started in the 1980s and continue to the present day when weather permits, include fixing retaining walls, replacing the original pavement with reinforced concrete, and work on tunnels, bridges, culverts and overlooks.

Buses

A fleet of vintage 1930s red buses, modernized in 2001 and called Red Jammers, or simply "Reds", continue the tradition of offering guided tours along the road. The original bus drivers became affectionately known as "Gear Jammers" or simply "Jammers" since they had to jam the manual gearbox into low to safely negotiate the steepest road sections. Thirty-three of the original buses were rebuilt with flexible-fuel engines which operate mainly on propane but can use gasoline, and with automatic transmissions, making the Jammer name archaic. Modern-style shuttle buses for shorter trips and Blackfeet tour buses operate on the road as well.

References in popular culture

Going-to-the-Sun Road is shown in the opening credits of the 1980 film The Shining, as aerial flybys of Wild Goose Island and the protagonist's car traveling along the north shore of Saint Mary Lake, through the East Side tunnel and onward, going to a mountain resort hotel for his job interview as a winter caretaker.

The road is also seen briefly in the 1994 film Forrest Gump. As Forrest reminisces with Jenny he remembers running across the U.S. and remarks, "Like that mountain lake. It was so clear, Jenny. It looked like there were two skies, one on top of the other." The shots in the background are Going-to-the-Sun Road and Saint Mary Lake.

The road is the subject of the song "Going-to-the-Sun Road" by Fleet Foxes, featured on their 2020 album Shore.

See also

Major points of interest along the road from west-to-east include:
Lake McDonald
Trail of the Cedars
Heavens Peak
Bird Woman Falls
Garden Wall / Weeping Wall
Logan Pass
Clements Mountain
Mount Jackson / Glacier
Going-to-the-Sun Mountain
Rising Sun
Saint Mary Lake

References

Further reading
Spokesman-Review article (Spokane, Washington)
Eugene Register-Guard article (Eugene, Oregon)
Ocala Star-Banner article (Ocala, Florida)

External links

Glacier National Park official website
Going-to-the-Sun-Road Information and Transit System
Current road status
Going-to-the-Sun Road: A Model of Landscape Engineering
Visit Montana - Going-to-the-Sun Road
Great Falls Tribune: Glacier National Park centennial timeline
Historic American Engineering Record (HAER) documentation, filed under West Glacier, Flathead County, MT:

 
Transportation in Flathead County, Montana
Transportation in Glacier County, Montana
National Register of Historic Places in Glacier National Park
Roads on the National Register of Historic Places in Montana
National Historic Landmarks in Montana
Historic Civil Engineering Landmarks
Protected areas of Flathead County, Montana
Protected areas of Glacier County, Montana
Historic American Engineering Record in Montana
History of the Rocky Mountains
National Register of Historic Places in Flathead County, Montana
National Register of Historic Places in Glacier County, Montana
1933 establishments in Montana
Glacier National Park (U.S.)
National Park Service rustic in Montana